The Realms of the Gods is a fantasy novel by Tamora Pierce, the fourth and last in a series of books, The Immortals.

Plot introduction (From the back of the book cover)
Daine and the mage Numair are faced with certain death when they are suddenly swept into the mystical realms of the gods, where Daine learns the secrets of her past. But she and Numair are both needed in the mortal world to help fight the desperate war that is raging in Tortall. And so they undertake the journey home – a dangerous journey that will teach them about life and about each other. Their path leads them to the final clash, which involves both gods and immortals – a battle in which the only chance for Tortall's future lies with Daine and her wild magic.

Set in Tortall during the reign of King Jonathan IV and Queen Thayet, Realms of the Gods is the final book in The Immortals series, which chronicles a time when the world is invaded by immortal creatures.

Plot summary

In this final book of Daine's story, she and Numair are teleported to the Divine Realms. Daine's mother, Sarra, is now the Green Lady, a minor goddess of healing and childbirth in the northern provinces. Although it has been hinted at before, Daine's father is revealed in this book as none other than the minor Northern God of the Hunt, Weiryn. Despite her happiness at being reunited with her long dead mother.

However, getting into the realm of the gods is much easier than getting out, so, aided by the badger god and the god of platypi, Daine and Numair must travel a very perilous road to the dragons, to petition them for help in getting back to the city of Tortall.

It is revealed that Numair Salmalin harbored very strong feelings for Daine, though she had not believed it to be anything serious. After saving her life from spidrens, Numair forgets himself and kisses Daine, admitting he loves her very much. Daine also loves him, but the two have doubts about a lasting relationship because of their age difference; Daine is sixteen, and Numair is twenty-seven (as quoted by Tamora Pierce through interview). Despite this, Numair asks Daine to marry him in the epilogue of the book. Daine does not agree yet, but it is revealed that they do live together in another one of Tamora Pierce's books, First Test. In Daughter of the Lioness, two other books of Tamora Pierce, they are married and have children.

They go through many perils just to reach the Dragonlands. Two dragons agree to bring them back. In the mortal realms, there is a major attack on the city of Tortall. In this fight, Daine defeats Emperor Ozorne. Daine then has to decide whether to stay in the mortal realms as a mortal or live in the Divine Realms as a minor goddess with her mother and father. With some discussion with her mother and Weiryn, her father, she decides her true home is the mortal realm. Her mother promises to visit when she can.

1996 American novels
1996 fantasy novels
Tortallan books
Atheneum Books books